Tashtagolsky District is an administrative district (raion), one of the nineteen in Kemerovo Oblast, Russia. As a municipal division, it is incorporated as Tashtagolsky Municipal District. It is located in the south of the oblast. Its administrative center is the town of Tashtagol (which is not administratively a part of the district). Population:  34,545 (2002 Census);

Administrative and municipal status
Within the framework of administrative divisions, Tashtagolsky District is one of the nineteen in the oblast. The town of Tashtagol serves as its administrative center, despite being incorporated separately as a town under oblast jurisdiction—an administrative unit with the status equal to that of the districts.

As a municipal division, the district is incorporated as Tashtagolsky Municipal District, with Tashtagol Town Under Oblast Jurisdiction being incorporated within it as Tashtagolskoye Urban Settlement.

Population
Ethnic composition (2010):.
 Russians – 87.9%
 Shors – 8.3%
 Germans – 1%
 others – 2.8%

People
 Ivan Yarygin (1948-1997)

References

Notes

Sources



Districts of Kemerovo Oblast